Nanjing University of Information Science and Technology (NUIST), colloquially Nan Xin Da is an elite Chinese state Double First Class University Plan university approved by the Ministry of Education of China, located in northern part of Nanjing city, China. It is well known for meteorology research and education. In 2021, the university was among the world's top 500 universities, according to QS World University Rankings, but was dropped out in 2022. Also, in 2021 it was among top 800 universities, according to Times Higher Education World University Rankings, but fell down to the top 1000 universities category in 2022. The international ranking of the university has consistently declined for three consecutive years in 2021, 2022 and 2023.

History
NUIST was formerly the Meteorology College of Nanjing University, was established in 1960 by the China Meteorological Administration, then changed the name into Nanjing Institute of Meteorology in May, 1963. NUIST is the oldest institution of higher learning of meteorology science in China.

The administration of NUIST was handed over from China Meteorological Administration to Jiangsu province in February, 2000. Its present name of Nanjing University of Information Science and Technology (NUIST) was adopted in May, 2004 with authorization by Jiangsu Government and the Ministry of Education of PRC.

The university is particularly well-known in China for renaming old and established departments to new ones to cash on sensation and hype. Following the Facebook’s change of its name to Meta in a major rebranding, China saw a surge of interest in metaverse. In 2022, NUIST, with no known strengths in metaverse or 3D games, renamed its Department of Information Engineering to the Department of Metaverse just to become China’s “first metaverse institution.” The critics argued it to be an attempt to cash on sensation and hype. The move was criticised by China Daily, the country's leading English newspaper, who argued that "the education and research of these departments with fashionable names are no different from before."

Programs
NUIST offers Associate, Bachelor, Master and Doctorate degree programs in areas including Atmospheric Science, Environmental Science, Engineering, management, literature, economics, laws and agriculture. It is a Chinese Ministry of Education Double First Class Discipline University, with Double First Class status in certain disciplines. Before 2004 some students were free of tuition if they agreed to work for China Meteorological Administration when entering the school and they will start to work for CMA by the fourth year of school while possible getting credentials as well.

At Autumn 2013 more than 200 foreign students from 43 countries were studying at NUIST.

Colleges and departments
Binjiang College
College of Adult Education
College of English Department
Technical College for Professional Training
Reading Academy
School of Business
Yue Jiang Academy
Foreign Languages Department
College of International Education – CIE (for foreign students)
Department of Atmospheric Science
Department of Mathematics and Statistics
Department of Applied Meteorological Science
Department of Physics and Optoelectronic Engineering
Department of Computer Science and Technology
Department of Electronic Engineering
Department of Law
Department of Public Administration
Department of Environmental Science and Engineering
Department of Economics and Trade
Department of Spatial Information Science
Department of Information Management
Department of Information and Communications Technologies
Department of Chinese Language and Literature
Department of Resource, Environment and City-rural Planning

Scholarships and awards
NUIST offers many types of scholarships for local and international students. It is one of the only two universities to offer the Chinese Government Scholarship-WMO Program. This is a specialized scholarship offered to students of meteorology or related fields. The only other university offering this scholarship is Hohai University.

Achievements 

 In 1972, three students of NUIST climbed Mount Everest. One of them set a record by climbing its north summit three times. 
In 2020, the most accurate measurement of the height of Mount Everest was made by a joint team of China and Nepal. Two alumni of NUIST provided weather forecast and other critical support to the team. NUIST also provided technical support to the team.
In 2021, the first academic study on Dual circulation was published by a team of researchers from NUIST.

External Partnership
The school has the scholarships from Chinese government, Hanban, the Jiangsu province to recruit students. In 2009, the school was founded the "Confucius class" in Bahamas, and it became the fourth Confucius class that Jiangsu Province has found in overseas universities, in 2011, "Confucius class" successfully upgraded to "Confucius Institute". The school has a "World Meteorological Organization Regional Training Center", which has trained more than 1,600 meteorological technicians and managers for 134 countries and regions, and successfully hosted the Tenth World Meteorological Organization Conference of Education and Training and the third session of " quantitative precipitation estimation and forecasting " international conference . In 2010, the World Meteorological Organization Executive Council session on 62 certificates in recognition of the important contribution of the school to make the international meteorological training. In 2015, the NUIST-Reading University (UK) Academy was jointly established, offering courses in pure sciences and social sciences.

References

External links

Department of Resource, Environment and City-rural Planning
Nanjing University of Information Science and Technology (Official Website - Chinese Language)
Nanjing University of Information Science & Technology(english version)
WMO Regional Training Center at NUIST
College of International Education (CIE) at NUIST
Nanjing University of Information Science and Technology Scholarship Programs

Universities and colleges in Nanjing